Ivangorod is a rural locality (a village) in Shestayevsky Selsoviet, Davlekanovsky District, Bashkortostan, Russia. The population was 377 as of 2010. There are 2 streets.

Geography 
Ivangorod is located 32 km north of Davlekanovo (the district's administrative centre) by road. Shestayevo is the nearest rural locality.

References 

Rural localities in Davlekanovsky District